The Momela (or Momella) Lakes are seven shallow lakes located within Arusha National Park namely: Big Momela, Small Momela, El Kekhotoito, Kusare, Rishateni, Lekandiro and Tulusia. Entrance to the park is in Village Momella, Meru District  of Arusha Region, Tanzania

Geography  
Lakes are alkaline formed from the volcanic debris created when Mount Meru blew its top 250,000 years ago. As the lakes are alkaline, animals do not drink from their waters, but you can spot zebras and birds on their banks. Lakes are the highlights of the Easter section of Arusha National Park, covering the forest of Mount Meru.

See also
Wildlife of Tanzania

References

Lakes of Tanzania
Saline lakes of Africa